2018 Men's Volleyball Thai-Denmark Super League was the 5th edition of the tournament. It was held at the MCC Hall of The Mall Bangkapi in Bangkok, Thailand from 28 March – 1 April 2018.

Teams

Foreign players

Pools composition

Preliminary round

Pool A

|}

|}

Pool B

|}

|}

Final round

Semifinals

|}

Final

|}

Final standing

Awards

See also 
 2018 Women's Volleyball Thai-Denmark Super League

References

Men's,2018
Volleyball,Thai–Denmark Super League
Thai–Denmark Super League